Dale Davis may refer to:

 Dale Davis (poet), American poet, writer, arts administrator and educator
 Dale Davis (basketball) (born 1969), American basketball player
 Dale Brockman Davis (born 1945), African-American artist, gallerist and educator